Kendall Durelle Briggs is an American composer of classical music and music theorist. He is a professor of music theory, music history and analysis at the Juilliard School in New York City. He is considered an authority on common practice harmony and counterpoint and has authored two books on the subject, The Language and Materials of Music and Tonal Counterpoint. He is a recipient of the Charles Ives Prize in composition from The Academy of Arts and Letters.

Biography
Briggs was born in Salt Lake City, Utah, and grew up in Seattle, Washington. He was first exposed to music by his mother, a classical pianist. He later studied the cello as well. He attended Pacific Lutheran University, where he received a bachelor's degree in composition, and later went on to study at the Juilliard School, where he received his master’s and doctoral degrees. He joined the faculty of The Juilliard School in 1994.

He has studied with renowned pedagogues Maurice Skones, conductor of Choir of the West; composer David Diamond; Mary Anthony Cox; and Charles Jones.

Works

Notable works include:

 Rhapsody for Cello and Orchestra ". . . a riveder le stelle"
 Sonata for Flute and Piano
 Sonata for Cello and Piano
 Sonata for French Horn and Piano
 Sonata for Trumpet and Piano
 Sonata for Viola and Piano
 Sonatine for Flute and Piano
 Sonatine for Piano 4-Hands
 Petite Suite for Piano, Violin, Cello
 Serenade for Chamber Orchestra
 Suite for Orchestra
 Symphony No. 1
 Symphony No. 2
 Symphony No. 3
 Sinfonietta for String Orchestra
 6 Suites for Solo Cello
 6 Preludes for Piano

Awards

Discography

References

External links
Official website of Kendall Durelle Briggs
Kendall Durelle Briggs biography at Juilliard School website

20th-century classical composers
21st-century classical composers
American male classical composers
American classical composers
Juilliard School alumni
Juilliard School faculty
Living people
21st-century American composers
20th-century American composers
20th-century American male musicians
21st-century American male musicians
Year of birth missing (living people)
Musicians from Salt Lake City